Kashi Math is a matha (monastery) and a spiritual organisation followed by the Madhva section of Gaud Saraswat Brahmins, who are also referred as Madhwa Saraswat Brahmins or Vaishnava Saraswat Brahmins. It dates back to the 16th century. With its headquarters in Brahma Ghat, Varanasi. Kashi Math has followers all over the Konkan belt, prominently in Mumbai, Goa, Udupi, Mangalore, Kochi and other parts of Karnataka and Kerala.

Deities 
The principal deities of Kashi Math are charaprathishta (“moving installation") idols of Vyasa, Rama and Narasimha, who are also collectively known as the Vyasa Raghupathi Narasimha.

Gurus 

The Kashi Math follows the Guru-shishya tradition where the Guru of the Math initiates a shishya to succeed him upon his Samadhi. Samyamindra Thirtha is the 21st and current head (Mathadipathi) of the Math. The heads have been:

Yadavendra Thirtha -I
Keshavendra Thirtha
Upendra Thirtha -I
Yadavendra Thirtha -II
Raghavendra Thirtha 
Devendra Thirtha
Madhavendra Thirtha
Jnaneendra Thirtha
Yadavendra Thirtha -III
Upendra Thirtha -II
Rajendra Thirtha
Vishnu Thirtha
Sureendra Thirtha
Vibhudendra Thirtha
Sumatheendra Thirtha
Vasudendra Thirtha
Bhuvanendra Thirtha
Varadendra Thirtha
Sukrathindra Thirtha
Sudhindra Thirtha
Samyamindra Thirtha

List of Branch Maths

Internal strife 
On 7 July 1989, in accordance with the guru-shishya tradition, the then guru, Sudhindra Thirtha, initiated a follower into sanyasa so that in due course they would succeed him as the 21st guru. For reasons not fully known, serious differences between Sudhindra Tirtha and his appointed successor, Raghavendra Tirtha, became apparent around 2000–2001 amidst concerns about insubordination and integrity. On 19 July 2000, the mathadipathi removed Raghavendra Tirtha from his position of successor by making use of an earlier communication from November 1999 which had requested relief from the tutelage. This removal necessitated the initiation of a new shishya to succeed Sudindra Thirtha and this was done on 20 June 2002 when Samyamindra Thirtha were initiated.

Thereafter the tussle among the pontiffs turned into a dispute over the control of the Kashi Math and the ownership of its many valuables and ornaments used during various religious observances. Those included about 234 pieces of jewelry and silver articles, as well as 27 idols including the main idol of Vyasa Raghupathi. Raghavendra Tirtha had possession of these items but was ordered by Court in Tirupathi to give them to Sudhindra Tirtha. The Court upheld the status of the senior pontiff and the mathadhipathi, accepted the junior's abdication and directed him to return all belongings of the math and refrain from interfering in its affairs.

A petition seeking a stay on the order was dismissed by the Andhra Pradesh High Court. The Supreme Court of India also confirmed the same on 2 December 2009 and upheld the High Court order recognizing Sudhendra Tirtha as mathadipadi.

After months of defying various court orders, Raghavendra Tirtha absconded with the valuables and ornaments and was arrested at Kadapa in October 2011.

Thereafter in November 2011, the 'parikaras' were handed over to Sudhindra Tirtha. Samyamindra Thirtha became main disciple (patta shishya) and successor (uttaradhikari) of Kashi Math.

Sudhindra Thirtha attained Vrindavan on 17 January 2016 at Vyasashram, Haridwar. As per the tradition, Samyamindra Thirtha became the new head of Kashi Math and they officially took charge on 28 January 2016 at Vyasashram, Haridwar. They are currently holding the 'parikaras' and offering the daily pujas.

Parihara & Punah Prathishtta Mahotsav 2012

Punah Prathishta of Sree Vyasa Raghupathi Narasimha of Shri Kashi Math Samsthan was done at Shri Venkataramana Temple on Car Street, Mangalore On Wednesday 13 June 2012.

The Punah Prathishta ceremony had begun on 9 June 2012 under the guidance of Shrimad Sudhindra Thirtha Swamiji, Mathadhipati of Shree Kashi Math Samsthan and their Patta Shishya Shrimad Samyamindra Thirtha Swamiji, who jointly conducted the rituals of the re-installation of the idol of Shri Vyasa Raghupati, the presiding deities of Shree Kashi Math Samsthan, at the Math Premises (Sri Sudhindra Sabha Sadan) in S.V Temple at the Karkataka Lagnam at 8:45 a.m.

These rituals included the Panchamrutha Abhisheka to Shri Vyasa, Raghupathi and Lord Narasimha.
108 aavarthane pavamana kalashabhisheka, gangadhi sapthaha teerthabhisheka, sanidhya Havana, mahapurnahuthi, and muhurtha nireekshane. Around 50,000 devotees, along with thousands of volunteers, took part in rituals such as prasanna puja, astamangala nireekshana, patta Kanika and other such rituals. As part of these rituals, devotees made offerings to Hari Gurus and received prasadam and blessings.

See also 
 Gokarna Math (Vaishnava math)
 Shri Gaudapadacharya Math (Smarta Tradition math)

References

External links 
 www.kashimath.org

Hindu monasteries in India
Organisations based in Varanasi
Madhva mathas